is a town located in Gunma Prefecture, Japan. , the town had an estimated population of 11,221 in 4502 households, and a population density of 520 persons per km².

Geography
Chiyoda is located in the extreme southern corner Gunma prefecture, bordered by Saitama Prefecture to the south.

Surrounding municipalities
Gunma Prefecture
 Tatebayashi
 Meiwa
 Oizumi
 Ōra
Saitama Prefecture
 Kumagaya
 Gyōda
 Hanyū

Climate
Chiyoda has a Humid continental climate (Köppen Cfa) characterized by hot summers and cold winters.  The average annual temperature in Chiyoda is 14.5 °C. The average annual rainfall is 1273 mm with September as the wettest month. The temperatures are highest on average in August, at around 26.8 °C, and lowest in January, at around 3.4 °C.

Demographics
Per Japanese census data, the population of Chiyoda has remained relatively steady over the past 60 years.

History
The villages of Tominaga, Eiraku, and Nagae were created within Ōra District, Gunma Prefecture on April 1, 1889 with the creation of the modern municipalities system after the Meiji Restoration. The three villages merged on March 31, 1955 to form the village of Chiyoda. However, the former village of Nagae separated out on September 30, 1956 and became part of Nakashima (today Ōra, Gunma). Chiyoda was raised to town status on April 1, 1982.

Government
Chiyoda has a mayor-council form of government with a directly elected mayor and a unicameral town council of 12 members. Chiyoda, together with the other municipalities in Ōra District contributes three members to the Gunma Prefectural Assembly. In terms of national politics, the town is part of Gunma 3rd district of the lower house of the Diet of Japan.

Economy
Agriculture remains a mainstay of the local economy; however, Chiyoda has two industrial parks centered on a beer plant operated by Suntory and a chemical plant operated by Marufuku Chemifa.

Education
Chiyoda has two public elementary schools and one public middle schools operated by the town government. The town does not have a high school.

Transportation
Chiyoda is not served by any railway lines, nor by any national highways.

References

External links

Official Website 

Towns in Gunma Prefecture
Chiyoda, Gunma